Dmitri Goldenkov (born February 25, 1991) is a Russian professional ice hockey player.

Goldenkov played with HC Dynamo Moscow of the Kontinental Hockey League (KHL) during the 2012–13 season.

References

External links

1991 births
Living people
People from Prokopyevsk
HC Dynamo Moscow players
Russian ice hockey forwards
Sportspeople from Kemerovo Oblast